Quruzma (also, Quruzmaq, Kuruzma, and Quruzma) is a village and municipality in the Sabirabad Rayon of Azerbaijan.  It has a population of 1,917.

References 

Populated places in Sabirabad District